Omi-Ọṣun, literally meaning "Ọṣun's waters", is the northernmost source tributary of the Ọṣun River in southwestern Nigeria. The Omi-Ọṣun tributary rises from the eastern sector of the Yoruba hills and flows westwards into the Òyì River which subsequently flows southward along two deep gorges within the Oke-Ila quartzite ridges, (adjacent to  Oke-Ila Orangun), before its confluence with other rivers to form the main Osun.

Ruins of an ancient settlement called Omi-Ọṣun also exists along the Omi-Ọṣun river. This settlement was a former location of the Oke-Ila Orangun kingdom during the migrations of earlier centuries following the departure of the Oke-Ila and Ila factions from their ancient kingdom and mother city of Ila-Yara.

The name Omi-Ọṣun is attributed to the realization that the tributary feeds the Ọṣun River, as well as its subsequent dedication in ancient times to Ọṣun worship.

References

Rivers of Nigeria
Rivers of Yorubaland